Eulithidium pulloides is a species of small sea snail with calcareous opercula, a marine gastropod mollusk in the family Phasianellidae, the pheasant snails.

Description
The shell grows to a height of 2.5 mm. The shell is somewhat similar to Tricolia pullus, but is more solid, compact, and has a shorter spire. The suture is distinct.

Distribution
This species occurs in the Pacific Ocean off California.

References

External links
 To Biodiversity Heritage Library (7 publications)
 To USNM Invertebrate Zoology Mollusca Collection
 To ITIS
 To World Register of Marine Species
 

Phasianellidae
Gastropods described in 1865